Idle Wives is a 1916 American silent drama film co-directed by Lois Weber and Phillips Smalley. The film was released by Universal Film Manufacturing Company. Surviving reels of the film are preserved at the Library of Congress. The film was released on DVD/Blu-ray in 2018.

Plot  
Characters go to the movies to watch Life's Mirror, a film where they see their own lives turned into dramas. A shop girl dating a young man against her parents' wishes watches her onscreen counterpart become pregnant; an impoverished family watches as a family onscreen lives beyond their means; and an unfaithful husband watches as his onscreen wife leaves him and returns to social work. After the film characters have learned their lessons: the shop girl apologizes to her parents; the family decides to live within its means; and the wealthy man leaves his mistress and returns to his wife.

Cast 
 Lois Weber as Anne
 Phillips Smalley as John Wall
 Mary MacLaren as Molly
 Edwin Hearn as Richard
 Seymour Hastings as Billy Shane
 Countess Du Cello as Wall's Mother
 Pauline Aster as Alberta
 Cecilia Matthews as Molly's Mother
 Ben F. Wilson as Mr. Jamison
 Maude George as Mrs. Jamison
 Neva Gerber as Mary Wells
 Charles Perley as Tough Burns

References

Further reading

External links

Idle Wives on National Film Preservation Foundation cite with a brief clip and film notes by film historian Shelley Stamp
Idle Wives entry in American Film Institute catalog

1916 films
American silent feature films
Films directed by Lois Weber
1916 drama films
American black-and-white films
Silent American drama films
Universal Pictures films
1910s American films